Judson Building is a historic apartment building located at Muncie, Delaware County, Indiana. It was built about 1900, and is a two-story, five bay by nine bay, Romanesque Revival style red brick building.  It has a flat roof, segmental arch openings, and projecting angular bays.

It was added to the National Register of Historic Places in 1988.

References

Residential buildings on the National Register of Historic Places in Indiana
Romanesque Revival architecture in Indiana
Residential buildings completed in 1900
Buildings and structures in Muncie, Indiana
National Register of Historic Places in Muncie, Indiana